Al Habtoor Motors is an automobile distributor in the United Arab Emirates (UAE) and part of the Al Habtoor Group. The company was established in 1983.
The company is the dealer for Mitsubishi, Buggati, McLaren, Bentley, Fuso, Chery and JAC Motors. 

In 2011, the company launched the CarZone Megastore, the largest used car supermarket in the UAE.

In 2012, the group launched an auto parts company called Global Auto Parts, which supplies parts for all major Japanese and Korean car brands, and major European and American passenger cars and trucks.

In 2015, Al Habtoor Motors was awarded the franchise of Mitsubishi Fuso in the Kingdom of Saudi Arabia. With this appointment, the company ventures into the region's largest automotive market, and plans to set up a wide network of Fuso Showrooms, Parts and Service Centre across various cities in KSA.

In 2016, Al Habtoor Motors launched in Dubai the biggest Bentley showroom in the world.

References

Further reading

External links
 
 Habtoor Motors Car Servicing Project (UAE)

Retail companies of the United Arab Emirates
Auto dealerships
Retail companies established in 1983
Companies based in Dubai
Emirati companies established in 1983